Jean Marie Charles Abadie (25 March 1842 – 29 June 1932) was a French ophthalmologist who was a native of Saint-Gaudens. 

He became a hospital intern in 1868 and a medical doctor in 1870. He practiced medicine at the Hôtel-Dieu de Paris. In 1881 he was made a chevalier of the Légion d'honneur. 

Abadie was involved in developing treatments for glaucoma and trachoma, and discovered a diagnostic sign for exophthalmic goiter known as "Abadie's sign". He also introduced the practice of injecting alcohol into the Gasserian ganglion as a treatment for trigeminal neuralgia.

Published works 
  – Spasms of the eye muscles.
 ; Paris, 1876/1877 – On maladies of the eyes. 
 ; Paris, 1881 – Lessons on clinical ophthalmology.
 ; Paris, 1890 – New treatment for sympathetic ophthalmia.

Also, he contributed numerous articles to the journals "" and "".

References

French ophthalmologists
1842 births
1932 deaths
People from Saint-Gaudens, Haute-Garonne